Live Arts Week is a project by Xing, born in 2012 out the fusion of the experiences of the two Bologna festivals (2000>2011): Netmage - International Live Media Festival and F.I.S.Co. - Festival Internazionale sullo Spettacolo Contemporaneo.
Live Arts Week takes place in Bologna, Italy, once a year, and it is developed throughout one week in different locations and settings in town.

Mission

Event dedicated to live arts, it hosts a blend of artworks and productions that revolve around the presence, performance and perceptual experience of sounds and visions, with a program of live works (performances, environments, concerts, live media, expanded cinema) presented by important personalities in the international and contemporary research scene. The set-up suggests a citywide event, involving several spaces, organizations and institutions active in the field of contemporary arts in Bologna.

History

Edition 2012
Venues:
Palazzo Re Enzo • Teatro Duse • Spazio Carbonesi •  Hotel Palace • Nowhere • Palazzo Pepoli - Museo della Storia di Bologna

Artists:

 Anne Juren (FR-AU)
 Antonia Baehr (DE)
 Blues Control (US)/Laraaji (US)
 Canedicoda(IT)/Mirko Rizzi (IT)
 Christine De Smedt (BE)
 Claudia Castellucci (IT)
 Cristina Rizzo (IT)/Lucia Amara (IT)
 Denis Tyfus (BE)/Vom Grill (BE)
 Floris Vanhoof (BE)
 Hartmut Geerken (DE)
 Hieroglyphic Being  (US)
 Jan Ritsema (NL)
 Krõõt Juurak (EE)
 Luca Trevisani (IT)
 Luís Miguel Félix (PT)
 Marino Formenti (IT-AT)
 Orphan Fairytale (BE)
 Ottaven (IT)
 Robert Steijn (NL-AT)
 Salka Ardal Rosengren (SE)
 Saša Asentić (RS)
 Silvia Costa (IT)
 The Claw ( (US)
 Yannick Val Gesto  (BE)/Roman Hiele (BE)
 Xavier Le Roy(FR/DE)
 Yves-Noël Genod(FR)
 Giovanni Anceschi (IT)
 Ben Rivers (GB)
 Mattin (ES)

Edition 2013
Venues:
MAMbo - Museo d'Arte Moderna di Bologna • Cinema Lumière • Garage Pincio • Cassero

Artists:
 
 Alix Eynaudi  (FR AU)
 Anne Juren/Marianne Baillot/Alix Eynaudi (FR/AU/BE/PL)
 Daniela Cattivelli (IT)
 Dmitry Paranyushkin (RU-DE)
 Dracula Lewis/Out4Pizza (IT/US)
 Elise Florenty/Marcel Türkowsky (FR/DE)
 Eszter Salamon/Christine De Smedt (DE/BE)
 Mårten Spångberg/Linnea Martinsson (SW)
 Goodiepal (DK)
 Helm (GB)
 Junko (JP)
 Lucio Capece (AR-DE)
 Muna Mussie (IT-BE)
 Nature Theater of Oklahoma (US)
 Pierre Huyghe (FR)
 Riccardo Benassi (IT)
 Rose Kallal/Joe DeNardo(CA/US)
 Sara Manente (IT-BE)
 Sun Araw(US)
 :en:Tony Conrad (US)

Edition 2014 
Venues:
MAMbo - Museo d'Arte Moderna di Bologna • Cinema Lumière • Biblioteca Salaborsa

Artists:

 Aki Onda (US-JP) 
 Barokthegreat (IT)
 Ben Rivers/Ben Russell(UK/US)
 Ben Vida (US)
 Canedicoda(IT)
 Daniel Löwenbrück (Raionbashi) (DE) 
 Dora Garcia (ES)
 Doreen Kutzke (DE) 
 Enrico Boccioletti (IT)
 Èlg (FR)
 Gaëlle Boucand (FR)
 Ken Jacobs (US) 
 Marco Berrettini (CH)
 Maria Hassabi (US-CY)
 Mette Edvardsen (NO-BE) 
 MSHR (US)
 Neil Beloufa (FR)
 Porter Ricks (Thomas Köner/Andy Mellwig) (DE/DE)
 Rashad Becker (SY-DE)

Edition 2015 
Venues:
Ex Ospedale dei Bastardini • MAMbo - Museo d'Arte Moderna di Bologna

Artists:

 Adrian Rew (US)
 Alessandro di Pietro (IT)
 Andrea Magnani (IT)
 Andrew Norman Wilson (US)
 Anne de Vries (NL)
 Anthony Pateras (AT-DE)
 Auto Italia (US/GB)
 Ben Vickers/Holly White (GB/GB)
 Canedicoda (IT)
 Carola Spadoni (IT-DE)
 Claudia Triozzi (FR-IT)
 David Horvitz (US)
 Enrico Boccioletti (IT)
 Francesco Cavaliere (IT-DE)
 Gábor Lázár (HU)
 Harm van den Dorpel (NL)
 Ilja Karilampi (ES-DE)
 Jaakko Pallasvuo (FI-DE)
 Jack Hauser/Satu Herrala/Sabina Holzer/Jeroen Peeters (AT/FI/AT/BE)           
 Jennifer Chan  (CA)
 Luciano Chessa (IT-US)
 MACON (FR)
 MK/Luca Trevisani/Franco Farinelli/Roberta Mosca/Sigourney Weaver/Lorenzo Bianchi Hoesch (IT)
 Marco Dal Pane (IT)
 Markus Öhrn (SE)
 Martin Kohout (CZ-DE)
 N.M.O. (Morten J Olsen/Rubén Patiño) (NO/ES)
 Ogino Knauss (IT-DE)
 Philip Corner (US)
 Riccardo Benassi (IT-DE)
 Roberto Fassone (IT)
 Salvatore Panu (IT)
 Seth Price (US)
 VA AA LR (Adam Asnan/Vasco Alves/Louie Rice) (GB/PT/GB)
 Valerio Tricoli (IT-DE)
 Vera Mantero & guests (PT)
 Xavier Le Roy (DE/FR)
 Yuri Pattison (IE)
 Z.B. Aids (FR)

Edition 2016
Venue:
MAMbo - Museo d'Arte Moderna di Bologna

Artists:

Alix Eynaudi
Duppy Gun
Florian Hecker
Invernomuto
Lamin Fofana
Florian Hecker
Marco Berrettini /* MELK PROD
Minoru Sato
Mårten Spångberg
Primitive Art
Sara Manente
Trond Reinholdtsen
Zapruder filmmakersgroup

Edition 2017 
Venues:
Ex GAM • Teatro Comunale di Bologna • Galleria P420 • LOCALEDUE • CAR DRDE • Tripla

Artists:

 Alexandra Bachzetsis (CH)
 Anastasia Ax  (SE)/C. Spencer Yeh (TW)
 Antonija Livingstone (CA)/Claudia Hill  (DE)
 Ashes Withyman Moore (CA)
 Carlos Casas (ES)
 Coro Alpino RC (IT)
 Costante Biz (IT)
 Cristina Kristal Rizzo (IT)
 Dana Michel (CA)
 Lorenzo Senni (IT) 
 Luigi Ontani(IT) 
 Margherita Morgantin (IT)/Martina Raponi (IT)
 Maria Hassabi (CY)
 Mattin (ES)/Miguel Prado (ES)
 Mette Edvardsen (NO-BL)
 Nico Vascellari (IT)
 Nicola Ratti  (IT)
 Nicolás Lamas  (PE)
 Olivier Kosta-Thèfaine (FR) 
 Prurient (US)
 Silvia Costa (IT)
 Ulrich Krieger (DE)
 Valerio Tricoli (IT)

Edition 2018 
Venues:
Ex GAM • Padiglione Esprit Nouveau • MAMbo - Museo d'Arte Moderna di Bologna • Galleria P420 • LOCALEDUE • CAR DRDE • GALLERIAPIÙ • Tripla • Galleria De' Foscherari

Artists:

 Antonia Baehr/Latifa Laabissi/Nadia Lauro (DE/FR/FR)
 David Wampach  (FR) 
 Goodiepal & Pals (DK)
 Hannah Sawtell (GB) 
 Julian Weber (DE)
 Krõõt Juurak (EE)
 Leandro Nerefuh/Libidiunga Cardoso/Cecilia Lisa Eliceche/Caetano  (BR/GA) 
 Liliana Moro (IT)
 Mark Fell & Drumming (GB/PT) 
 Mark Fell & Justin F. Kennedy (GB/US)
 Mark Fell (GB)
 Mette Edvardsen(NL-BE) 
 NO-PA PA-ON/Luciano Maggiore/Louie Rice  (IT/GB)
 Paolo Bufalini/Filippo Cecconi (IT)
 Rian Treanor  (GB) 
 Rodrigo Sobarzo de Larraechea (CL-NL)

Edition 2019 
Venues:
Galleria P420 •  Gelateria Sogni di Ghiaccio •  Fontana Parco della Montagnola •  Chiesa Evangelica Metodista •  Palazzo Volpe • Pinacoteca di Bologna •  Palazzo Pezzoli • Accademia di Belle Arti di Bologna • Cinema Modernissimo •  Ex negozio materiale electrico Priori

Artists:

 Barokthegreat (IT)
 Billy Bultheel (BE-DE)
 Catherine Christer Hennix (SE-DE)
 Doro Bengala (IT) 
 Ellen Arkbro (SE)/Marcus Pal (SE) 
 Gelateria Sogni di Ghiaccio(Filippo Marzocchi/Mattia Pajè) & friends  (Giovanni Rendina, Andrea Magnani, Daniele Guerrini) (IT) 
 Marcelo Evelin/Demolition Incorporada (BR) 
 Michele Rizzo (IT-NL) 
 Simon Vincenzi (GB)
 Sorour Darabi (IR-FR) 
 Stine Janvin (NO-DE)

Edition 2020 
Venues:
Bologna outdoors • LOCALEDUE • P420 • Accademia di Belle Arti di Bologna • Spazio Hera • FMAV Fondazione Modena Arti Visive • Palazzo Vizzani • Teatro Auditorium Manzoni • Ex Chiesa di San Mattia

Artists:

 YEAH YOU (Gustav Thomas and Elvin Brandhi) (GB)

Other invited artists (events cancelled due to COVID-19 pandemic):

 Geumhyung Jeong  (KR)
 Katerina Andreou (GR/FR)
 Mette Edvardsen/Matteo Fargion (NO/BL/GB)
 Riccardo Benassi (IT)
 Onyx Ashanti (USA)
 Graham Lambkin (GB)
 Yasmine Hugonnet (CH)
 Canedicoda (IT)
 Cristina Kristal Rizzo/Charlie Laban Trier (IT/DK/NL)

Edition 2021 
Venues:
Lungo Reno Quartiere Barca • Orti Comunali Boschetto

Artists:

 Alessandro Di Pietro
 Alessandro Rilletti
 Alix Eynaudi
 Andrea Dionisi
 Andrea Magnani
 Annamaria Ajmone
 Anne Faucheret 
 Attila Faravelli
 Biagio Caravano
 Bianca R. Schroeder 
 Canedicoda 
 Carolina Fanti 
 Caterina Montanari 
 Chiara Lucisano 
 Christophe Albertijn 
 Costanza Candeloro 
 Cristina Kristal Rizzo 
 Edoardo Ciaralli
 Elena Radice
 Eleonora Luccarini
 Enrico Gilardi 
 Enrico Malatesta 
 Francesca Duranti 
 Francesca Ugolini 
 Francesco Cavaliere 
 g. olmo stuppia  
 Gina Monaco 
 Gitte Hendrikx 
 Giuseppe Vincent Giampino 
 Guillermo De Cabanyes
 Invernomuto
 Isabella Mongelli
 Jacopo Benassi
 Kinkaleri 
 Laura Pante
 Lele Marcojanni 
 Loredana Tarnovschi 
 Lucia Amara 
 Marco Mazzoni 
 Marcos Simoes 
 Margherita Morgantin
 Massimo Conti 
 Mattia Paje
 Michele Di Stefano 
 Michele Lori 
 Michele Rizzo 
 Milena Rossignoli 
 mk 
 Muna Mussie 
 Nicola Ratti 
 Paolo Bufalini
 Renato Grieco
 Roberta Mosca 
 Roberta Pagani 
 Sara Manente
 Sebastiano Geronimo
 Standards 
 Virginia Genta
 Vittoria Caneva
 Zapruder

See also 

Performing arts
Performance art
Sound Art
Expanded Cinema
Happening
Experimental music

References

External sources
Xing Official Website
Bologna Contemporanea
Benoit Antille, Michele Fiedler, Andrey Parshikov, ''Since the beginning it was very simple in Sotto la strada, la spiaggia" , Torino, ed.Fondazione Sandretto Re Rebaudengo, 2012

Music festivals in Italy
Performance art
Installation art
New media art
Video art
Digital art
Contemporary art organizations
Art exhibitions in Italy
2012 establishments in Italy
2013 establishments in Italy
2014 establishments in Italy
2015 establishments in Italy
2016 establishments in Italy
2017 establishments in Italy
2018 establishments in Italy
2019 establishments in Italy